Bryce Taylor (born September 27, 1986) is an American-German professional basketball coach and former player. He played college basketball at University of Oregon. In April 2018, he was granted German citizenship.

Taylor's father Brian Taylor spent 10 years in the ABA and NBA, averaging 18.6 points per game. He was a nine-time ABA All-Star and the 1973 ABA American Basketball association Rookie of the Year.

High school career
Prior to arriving at the University of Oregon, Taylor starred at Harvard-Westlake School, where he set a school record by scoring 54 points in a game, as his team won three straight CIF championships.

College career
Taylor arrived at Oregon with high expectations, and as a freshman he did not disappoint.  Taylor averaged 11.6 points per game and shot 37% from three-point range.  Highlights included a then career-high 26 point effort in December against Fresno State, a contest in which he scored the game winner.  However, Taylor's sophomore season was a disappointing one as his scoring average dipped to 9.3 points per game.

Known primarily as a three-point shooter in high school and his first two years at Oregon, Taylor reinvented his game over the 2006 off-season, establishing himself not only as a slasher but also as a defensive specialist.  As a result, Oregon head coach Ernie Kent regularly assigned Taylor to guard the opposing team's best player.  Taylor also rediscovered his three-point prowess during the 2006–07 campaign, and is currently connecting on 42.4% from beyond the arc.  For his efforts, Taylor was named the team's Most Improved Player.

During the 2007 Pac-10 Tournament Championship game against the USC Trojans, Taylor poured in 32 points, making all 11 of his shots from the field in an 81–57 drubbing. He was a perfect 7 for 7 from the three-point line and 3 for 3 from the foul line in helping Oregon win their second Pac-10 Tournament Championship in the last five years.

Professional career
Taylor played his rookie season in Italian Lega Basket Serie A for Sutor Montegranaro in 2008–2009. He then moved to German Basketball Bundesliga the following season and played for Telekom Baskets Bonn. In 2010 Bryce Taylor signed a short-term deal with German team Alba Berlin which was extended for the rest of the season. He emerged more and more into a crowd favorite due to his spectacular game. He re-signed for another one-year deal for the 2011–12 season, where he was even voted into the All-BBL Second Team. In the 2012–13 season he played for the Artland Dragons.

In June 2013 he signed a two-year deal with Bayern Munich, and helped the club win the 2014 championship. In July 2014, Taylor agreed on a contract extension with Bayern until 2016, including a team option for the 2016–17 season.

On June 25, 2017, Taylor signed a three-year contract with Brose Bamberg. Taylor averaged 4.4 points and 0.9 rebounds per game during the 2019-20 season. He parted ways with the team on August 11, 2020. The following day, Taylor signed with the Hamburg Towers.

Coaching 
In the 2021-22 season, Taylor served as Player Development Assistant for the Indiana Pacers in the NBA under head coach Rick Carlisle. In June 2022, he was appointed assistant coach of German Bundesliga side EWE Baskets Oldenburg.

Career statistics

|-
| style="text-align:left;"| 2013–14
| style="text-align:left;"| Bayern Munich
|EuroLeague
| 22 || 23.4 || .463 || .510 || .900 || 3.5 || 1.2 || 1.1 || .0 || 8.5 
|-
| style="text-align:left;"| 2014–15
| style="text-align:left;"| Bayern Munich
|EuroLeague
| 2 || 19.3 || .286 || .500 || .833 || 3.0 || 1.5 || 1.0 || .5 || 5.5 
|-
| style="text-align:left;"| 2015–16
| style="text-align:left;"| Bayern Munich
|Basketball Bundesliga
| 35 || 26.2 || .541 || .482 || .939 || 3.3 || 1.7 || 1.1 || .1 || 13.6 
|-
| style="text-align:left;"| 2015–16
| style="text-align:left;"| Bayern Munich
|EuroLeague
| 9 || 23.4 || .400 || .304 || .882 || 3.6 || 1.3 || .6 || .1 || 6.7 
|-
| style="text-align:left;"| 2017–18
| style="text-align:left;"| Brose Bamberg
|EuroLeague
| 10 || 23.9 || .455 || .433 || .833 || 2.1 || .7 || .7 || .2 || 6.8
|-
| style="text-align:left;"| 2018–19
| style="text-align:left;"| Brose Bamberg
|Basketball Bundesliga
| 30 || 20.0 || .457 || .438 || .913 || 2.0 || 1.3 || .7 || .1 || 7.3
|-
| style="text-align:left;"| 2020–21
| style="text-align:left;"| Hamburg Towers
|Basketball Bundesliga
| 26 || 15.7 || .473 || .452 || .867 || 1.1 || .4 || .5 || .1 || 6.0
|-
|-class=sortbottom
| align="center" colspan=2 | Career
| All Leagues
| 134 || 21.9 || .482 || .456 || .913 || 2.5 || 1.2 || .8 || .1 || 8.8

References

External links
 Bryce Taylor at beko-bbl.de
 Bryce Taylor at espn.com
 Bryce Taylor at euroleague.net
 Bryce Taylor at goducks.com
 

1986 births
Living people
Alba Berlin players
American expatriate basketball people in Germany
American expatriate basketball people in Italy
American men's basketball players
Artland Dragons players
Basketball players from San Diego
Brose Bamberg players
FC Bayern Munich basketball players
German men's basketball players
German people of African-American descent
Hamburg Towers players
Harvard-Westlake School alumni
Oregon Ducks men's basketball players
Shooting guards
Sutor Basket Montegranaro players
Telekom Baskets Bonn players